Giorgio Gregorini is an Italian makeup artist. He has worked on films such as Moulin Rouge! (2001), Gangs of New York (2002),
Troy (2004), Kingdom of Heaven (2005), Babel (2006), Avengers: Age of Ultron (2015) and Suicide Squad (2016), which has earned him numerous awards and nominations. For the latter he won Academy Award for Best Makeup and Hairstyling at 89th Academy Awards.

Awards and nominations

 2002: Primetime Emmy Award for Outstanding Hairstyling for a Limited Series or Movie - Arabian Nights
 2012: Primetime Emmy Award for Outstanding Hairstyling for a Limited Series or Movie - Hatfields & McCoys 
 2017: Academy Award for Best Makeup and Hairstyling - Suicide Squad

References

External links
 

Living people
Italian make-up artists
Best Makeup Academy Award winners
Year of birth missing (living people)